Dyschlorodes is a genus of moths in the family Geometridae erected by Claude Herbulot in 1966. All the species in this genus are from Madagascar.

Species
Dyschlorodes bicolor Viette, 1971
Dyschlorodes hepatias Herbulot, 1966

References

Geometrinae